The Safety Investigation Authority of Finland (SIAF or SIA, lit. Accident Investigation Center, shortened to) is the accident investigation authority of Finland. It investigates all major accidents, and all aviation, maritime, and rail accidents and incidents. SIAF is located within the Ministry of Justice, and is headquartered in Helsinki, Finland.

The SIAF was previously known in English as the Accident Investigation Board of Finland.

Organization 
The SIAF consists of five investigation branches: aviation, maritime, rail, other accidents, and exceptional events. The SIA has appointed a chief investigator to each.

References

External links

 
 Safety Investigation Authority
 Safety Investigation Authority 
  Safety Investigation Authority 
 Safety Investigation Act (525/2011)

Ministry of Justice (Finland)
Aviation in Finland
Finland
Rail accident investigators
Organisations based in Helsinki
Transport organisations based in Finland
Transport safety organizations